A Roman villa was typically a farmhouse or country house built in the Roman Republic and the Roman Empire, sometimes reaching extravagant proportions.

Typology and distribution

Pliny the Elder (23–79 AD) distinguished two kinds of villas near Rome: the villa urbana, a country seat that could easily be reached from Rome (or another city) for a night or two; and the villa rustica, the farmhouse estate permanently occupied by the servants who generally had charge of the estate. The Roman Empire contained many kinds of villas, not all of them lavishly appointed with mosaic floors and frescoes. In the provinces, any country house with some decorative features in the Roman style may be called a "villa" by modern scholars. Some were pleasure houses, like Hadrian's Villa at Tivoli, that were sited in the cool hills within easy reach of Rome or, like the Villa of the Papyri at Herculaneum, on picturesque sites overlooking the Bay of Naples. Some villas were more like the country houses of England, the visible seat of power of a local magnate, such as the famous palace rediscovered at Fishbourne in Sussex.

Suburban villas on the edge of cities also occurred, such as the Middle and Late Republican villas that encroached on the Campus Martius, at that time on the edge of Rome, and which can be also seen outside the city walls of Pompeii. These early suburban villas, such as the one at Rome's Parco della Musica or at Grottarossa in Rome, demonstrate the antiquity and heritage of the villa suburbana in Central Italy.  It is possible that these early, suburban villas were also in fact the seats of power of regional strongmen or heads of important families (gentes). A third type of villa provided the organisational centre of the large holdings called latifundia, which produced and exported agricultural produce; such villas might lack luxuries. By the 4th century, "villa" could simply connote an agricultural holding: Jerome translated in the Gospel of Mark (xiv, 32) chorion, describing the olive grove of Gethsemane, with villa, without an inference that there were any dwellings there at all.

Under the Empire, a many patrician villas were built near the Bay of Naples, especially on the isle of Capri, at Circeii on the coast and at Antium. Wealthy Romans escaped the summer heat in the hills around Rome, especially around Frascati (cf. Hadrian's Villa). Cicero allegedly possessed no fewer than seven villas, the oldest of them, which he inherited, near Arpinum in Latium. Pliny the Younger had three or four, of which the example near Laurentum is well known from his descriptions.

Architecture of the villa complex

By the first century BC,  the "classic" villa took many architectural forms, with many examples employing atrium or peristyle, for enclosed spaces open to light and air. Upper class, wealthy Roman citizens in the countryside around Rome and throughout the Empire lived in villa complexes, the accommodation for rural farms. The villa-complex consisted of three parts:

 the pars urbana where the owner and his family lived. This would be similar to the wealthy person's home in the city and would have painted walls.
 the pars rustica where the chef and slaves of the villa worked and lived. This was also the living quarters for the farm's animals. There would usually be other rooms here that might be used as store rooms, a hospital and even a prison.
 the villa fructuaria would be the storage rooms. These would be where the products of the farm were stored ready for transport to buyers. Storage rooms here would have been used for oil, wine, grain, grapes and any other produce of the villa. Other rooms in the villa might include an office, a temple for worship, several bedrooms, a dining room and a kitchen.

Villas were often furnished with plumbed bathing facilities and many would have had an under-floor central heating known as the hypocaust.

Social history

A villa might be quite palatial, such as the villas of the imperial period, built on seaside slopes overlooking the Gulf of Naples at Baiae; others were preserved at Stabiae and Herculaneum by the ashfall and mudslide from the eruption of Mount Vesuvius in 79, which also preserved the Villa of the Papyri and its library. Smaller in the countryside, even non-commercial villas operated as largely self-supporting units, with associated farms, olive groves, and vineyards. Roman writers refer with satisfaction to the self-sufficiency of their villas, where they drank their own wine and pressed their own oil, a commonly used  literary topos. An ideal Roman citizen was the independent farmer tilling his own land, and the agricultural writers wanted to give their readers a chance to link themselves with their ancestors through this image of self-sufficient villas. The truth was not too far from the image, either, while even the profit-oriented latifundia, large slave-run villas, probably grew enough of all the basic foodstuffs to provide for their own consumption.

The late Roman Republic witnessed an explosion of villa construction in Italy, especially in the years following the dictatorship of Sulla (81 BC). In Etruria, the villa at Settefinestre was the centre of one of the latifundia that were involved in large-scale agricultural production. At Settefinestre and elsewhere, the central housing of such villas was not richly appointed. Other villas in the hinterland of Rome are interpreted in light of the agrarian treatises written by the elder Cato, Columella and Varro, all of whom sought to define the suitable lifestyle of conservative Romans, at least in idealistic terms.

Large villas dominated the rural economy of the Po Valley, Campania, and Sicily, and also operated in Gaul.  Villas were centers of a variety of economic activity such as mining, pottery factories, or horse raising such as those found in northwestern Gaul.  Villas specializing in the seagoing export of olive oil to Roman legions in Germany became a feature of the southern Iberian province of Hispania Baetica. Some luxurious villas have been excavated in North Africa in the provinces of Africa and Numidia.

Certain areas within easy reach of Rome offered cool lodgings in the heat of summer. Gaius Maecenas asked what kind of house could possibly be suitable at all seasons. The emperor Hadrian had a villa at Tibur (Tivoli), in an area that was popular with Romans of rank. Hadrian's Villa, dated to 123, was more like a palace, as Nero's palace, the Domus Aurea on the Palatine Hill in Rome, was disposed in groupings in a planned rustic landscape, more like a villa. Cicero had several villas. Pliny the Younger described his villas in his letters.

Some late Roman villae had luxuries like hypocaust-heated rooms with mosaic floors; mosaics are known even from Roman Britain. As the Roman Empire collapsed, villas in Britain were abandoned. In other areas some at least survived; large working villas were donated by aristocrats and territorial magnates to individual monks, often to become the nucleus of famous monasteries. In this way, the villa system of late Antiquity was preserved into the Early Middle Ages. Benedict of Nursia established his influential monastery of Monte Cassino in the ruins of a villa at Subiaco that had belonged to Nero. Around 590, Saint Eligius was born in a highly placed Gallo-Roman family at the 'villa' of Chaptelat near Limoges, in Aquitaine. The abbey at Stavelot was founded ca 650 on the domain of a former villa near Liège and the abbey of Vézelay had a similar founding. As late as 698, Willibrord established an abbey at a Roman villa of Echternach, in Luxembourg near Trier, which Irmina of Oeren, daughter of Dagobert II, king of the Franks, presented to him.

Villas in Roman Gaul 

As the empire expanded, villas spread into the Western provinces, including Gaul and Roman Britain. This was despite the fact that writers of the period could never quite decide on what was meant by villa, though it is clear from the treatise of Palladius that the villa had an agricultural and political role. In Roman Gaul the term villa was applied to many different buildings. The villas in Roman Gaul were also subject to regional differences, for example in northern and central Gaul colonnaded facades and pavilions were the fashion, whereas Southern Gaul were in peristyle. The villas style, locations, room numbers and proximity to a lake or ocean were manners of displaying the owners wealth.

Villas were also centres of production, and Gallo-Roman villa appear to have been closely associated with vineries and wine production. The owners were probably a combination of local Gallic elites who became quickly romanised after the conquest, as well as Romans and Italians who wished to exploit rich local resources. The villas would have been the centre of complex relationships with the local area. Much work would have been undertaken by slave labour or by local coloni ("tenant farmers"). There would also have been a steward in addition to the inhabiting family.

Attested Roman villas 

 Hadrian's Villa at Tivoli, Italy
 Villa Armira, near Ivaylovgrad, Bulgaria
 Fishbourne Roman Palace and Bignor Roman Villa in West Sussex, England
 Lullingstone Roman Villa in Kent, England
 Villa Romana del Casale in Piazza Armerina, Sicily, Italy
 Villa of the Quintilii, Rome, Italy
 Chedworth Roman Villa in Gloucestershire, England
 Littlecote Roman Villa in Wiltshire, England
 Villa Rumana in Żejtun, Malta
 Villa of the Mysteries, Pompeii
 House of Menander, Pompeii
 Pliny's Comedy and Tragedy villas, Lake Como, Italy
 La Olmeda Roman Villa in Palencia, Spain
 Roman Villa Borg, Germany

See also

 List of Roman villas in Belgium
 List of Roman villas in England
 List of Roman villas in Wales
 Roman villas in northwestern Gaul

References

Further reading

Villa Villae, French Ministry of Culture Website on Gallo-Roman villas